Petreu is a commune in Bihor County, Crișana, Romania with a population of 3,071 people (2011). It is composed of four villages: Abrămuț (Vedresábrány), Crestur (Apátkeresztúr), Făncica (Érfancsika), and Petreu.

The commune is located in the northern part of the county, on the banks of the river Barcău; to the west, between the Abrămuț and Făncica villages, flows the river Ier.

National road , which runs from Săcueni on the Hungarian border to Șimleu Silvaniei in Sălaj County, passes through the Crestur and Petreu villages.

The Abrămuț oil field is located on the territory of the commune.

The commune was called Abrămuț and its administrative seat was located in that village until 2022, when a law changed the name.

Natives
 Gavril Maghiar (1926–2005), sports shooter.

References

Communes in Bihor County
Localities in Crișana